Gabriele Cimini (born 9 June 1994) is an Italian right-handed épée fencer, 2022 team European champion, and 2021 Olympian.

Medal Record

World Championship

European Championship

Grand Prix

World Cup

References

1994 births
Living people
Italian male fencers
Italian épée fencers
Fencers at the 2015 European Games
European Games medalists in fencing
European Games bronze medalists for Italy
Olympic fencers of Italy
Fencers at the 2020 Summer Olympics
Sportspeople from Pisa
21st-century Italian people
World Fencing Championships medalists